Abu Yahya Zakariya was the Hafsid Caliph of Ifriqiya between 1490 and 1494.

References

15th-century Hafsid caliphs